Heicheng may refer to these places in China:

Heicheng Township, a township in Lincheng County, Hebei
Khara-Khoto, an ancient Tangut city, in Ejin Banner, Alxa League, Inner Mongolia
Sanhe, Ningxia, formerly Heicheng, a town in Haiyuan County, Ningxia